Dimitriadis is a Greek surname. It is a patronymic surname which literally means "the son of Dimitris". Notable people with the surname include:

Odysseas Dimitriadis, (1908–2005), Greek/Soviet classical music conductor
Vasilis Dimitriadis, (born 1966), Greek footballer
Vassilis Dimitriadis (skier), (born 1978), Greek alpine skier
Panajotis Dimitriadis, (born 1986), Swedish footballer
Anastasios Dimitriadis, (born 1997), Greek footballer
Georgios Dimitriadis, (born 1981), Cypriot former swimmer
Stefanos Dimitriadis, (born 1989), Greek swimmer
Konstantinos Dimitriadis, (born 1879 or 1881–1943), Bulgarian-Greek sculptor
Ioannis Dimitriadis, (born 1970), Greek footballer
Petros Dimitriadis, (born 1978), Greek footballer
Zafiris Dimitriadis, (born 1975), Greek footballer

See also
Dimitriadis 505

Greek-language surnames
Surnames
Patronymic surnames
Surnames from given names